

Order of wear 
Order of wear for decorations and awards within New Zealand's honours system.

Medals in bold are distinctly New Zealand awards.

Special awards
  The Victoria Cross and the Victoria Cross for New Zealand VC 
 The New Zealand Cross (1869) and  the New Zealand Cross (1999)  NZC 
  George Cross GC

Orders
  Knight Companion/Lady Companion of the Garter KG/LG
  Knight/Lady of the Thistle KT/LT
  Knight/Dame Grand Cross of the Order of the Bath GCB
  Order of Merit OM
  Order of New Zealand ONZ
  Baronet/Baronetess's badge (Bt., Bart. or Btss.)
  Knight/Dame Grand Companion of the New Zealand Order of Merit GNZM  (formerly Principal Companion of the New Zealand Order of Merit – PCNZM)
  Knight/Dame Grand Cross of the Order of St Michael and St George GCMG
  Knight/Dame Grand Cross of the Royal Victorian Order GCVO
  Knight/Dame Grand Cross of the Order of the British Empire GBE
  Companion of Honour CH
  Knight/Dame Companion of the New Zealand Order of Merit KNZM/DNZM (formerly Distinguished Companion of the New Zealand Order of Merit – DCNZM)
  Knight/Dame Commander of the Order of the Bath KCB/DCB
  Knight/Dame Commander of the Order of St Michael and St George KCMG/DCMG
  Knight/Dame Commander of the Royal Victorian Order KCVO/DCVO
  Knight/Dame Commander of the Order of the British Empire KBE/DBE
  Knight Bachelor Confers the title of Sir with no postnominals
  Companion of The New Zealand Order of Merit CNZM
  Companion of the Order of the Bath CB
  Companion of the Order of St Michael and St George CMG
  Commander of the Royal Victorian Order CVO
  Commander of the Order of the British Empire CBE
  New Zealand Gallantry Star NZGS
  New Zealand Bravery Star NZBS
  Companion of the Distinguished Service Order DSO
  Lieutenant of the Royal Victorian Order LVO
  Companion of The Queen’s Service Order QSO
  Officer of The New Zealand Order of Merit ONZM
  Officer of the Order of the British Empire OBE
  Companion of the Imperial Service Order ISO
  Member of the Royal Victorian Order MVO
  Member of The New Zealand Order of Merit MNZM
  Member of the Order of the British Empire MBE

Decorations
 New Zealand Gallantry Decoration NZGD
 New Zealand Bravery Decoration NZBD
 Royal Red Cross (Member) RRC
 Distinguished Service Cross DSC
 Military Cross MC
 Distinguished Flying Cross DFC
 Air Force Cross AFC
 Royal Red Cross (Associate) ARRC
 Order of St John

 Grade I – Bailiff or Dame Grand Cross GCStJ
 Grade II – Knight or Dame of Justice or Grace KStJ or DStJ
 Grade III – Chaplain ChStJ
 Grade III – Commander CStJ
 Grade IV – Officer OStJ
 Grade V – Member MStJ
 Grade VI – Esquire EsqStJ

Medals for gallantry and bravery
 Distinguished Conduct Medal DCM
 Conspicuous Gallantry Medal CGM 
 George Medal GM
 Distinguished Service Medal DSM (Imperial)
 Military Medal MM
 Distinguished Flying Medal DFM
 Air Force Medal AFM
 Queen's Gallantry Medal QGM
 New Zealand Gallantry Medal NZGM
 New Zealand Bravery Medal NZBM

Medals for meritorious service
  Royal Victorian Medal (Gold, Silver, Bronze) RVM
  Queen's Service Medal QSM
  New Zealand Antarctic Medal NZAM
  New Zealand Distinguished Service Decoration DSD
 British Empire Medal BEM
 Queen's Police Medal for Distinguished Service QPM
 Queen's Fire Service Medal for Distinguished Service QFSM

Campaign medals 
(Worn in order of date of participation in campaign or operation for which awarded.)
see New Zealand campaign medals

Other service medals
  New Zealand Special Service Medal (Nuclear Testing)
  New Zealand Special Service Medal (Asian Tsunami)
  New Zealand Special Service Medal (Erebus)
  Polar Medal (In order of date of award.)
  Imperial Service Medal

Jubilee, Coronation and New Zealand Commemoration medals
  King George V Coronation Medal, 1911
  King George V Silver Jubilee Medal, 1935
  King George VI Coronation Medal, 1937
  Queen Elizabeth II Coronation Medal, 1953
  Queen Elizabeth II Silver Jubilee Medal, 1977
  Queen Elizabeth II Golden Jubilee Medal, 2002 (Only for personnel who were awarded the medal while a member of the British forces)
              Queen Elizabeth II Diamond Jubilee Medal, 2012
  New Zealand 1990 Commemoration Medal 	
  New Zealand Suffrage Centennial Medal 1993

Efficiency and long service decorations and medals
  New Zealand Meritorious Service Medal (formerly the Medal for Meritorious Service awarded only to members of the New Zealand Army)
  New Zealand Defence Meritorious Service Medal
  New Zealand Police Meritorious Service Medal
  New Zealand Public Service Medal
  New Zealand Armed Forces Award
  New Zealand Army Long Service and Good Conduct Medal (formerly the Long Service and Good Conduct Medal, Military)
  Royal New Zealand Navy Long Service and Good Conduct Medal	
  Royal New Zealand Air Force Long Service and Good Conduct Medal
  New Zealand Police Long Service and Good Conduct Medal
  New Zealand Fire Brigades Long Service and Good Conduct Medal
  New Zealand Prison Service Medal
  New Zealand Traffic Service Medal
  New Zealand Customs Service Medal
  Efficiency Decoration ED
  Efficiency Medal  	
  Royal New Zealand Naval Reserve Decoration RD
  Royal New Zealand Naval Volunteer Reserve Decoration VRD
  Royal New Zealand Naval Volunteer Reserve Long Service and Good Conduct Medal
  Air Efficiency Medal AE (post-nominal used only when awarded to an officer)
  Queen's Medal For champion shots of the New Zealand Naval Forces
  Queen's Medal For champion shots of the Military Forces
  Queen's Medal For champion shots of the Air Force
  NZ Cadet Forces Medal

Service medals
  New Zealand Defence Service Medal

Commonwealth Independence medals
Instituted by the Sovereign. Worn in order of date of award.
  Papua New Guinea Independence Medal

Miscellaneous medals
  The Service Medal of the Order of St John

Commonwealth awards
Instituted by the Sovereign as Head of State, other than in right of New Zealand or the United Kingdom.
Worn in order of date of award. At the discretion of the holder, a Commonwealth award may be worn in a position comparable to, but following, the equivalent New Zealand or British Order, Decoration or Medal.
  International Force East Timor Medal
  Australian Defence Medal (for ex-members of the ADF)

Other Commonwealth awards
Instituted by Commonwealth countries of which the Sovereign is not Head of State.
Instituted since 1949, otherwise than by the Sovereign, and awards by the states of Malaysia and the State of Brunei. Worn in order of date of award. These awards may only be worn when The Sovereign’s permission has been given.
  Pingat Jasa Malaysia Medal

United States awards and decorations
These awards may only be worn when the Sovereign’s permission has been given.
  United States Bronze Star Medal
  United States Army Commendation Medal
  United States Army Achievement Medal
  United States Antarctica Service Medal

Foreign medals
  Korean War Service Medal
  South Vietnamese Campaign Medal
  Zimbabwe Independence Medal (Approved for restricted wear only)
  Kuwait Liberation Medal (Approved for restricted wear only)
  Multinational Force and Observers Medal
  Timor Leste Solidarity Medal

United Nations medals
  United Nations Truce Supervision Organisation Medal (UNTSO)
  United Nations Military Observer Group in India and Pakistan Medal (UNMOGIP)
  United Nations Service Medal for Korea
  United Nations Emergency Force Medal
  United Nations Observation Group in Lebanon (UNOGIL)
  United Nations Operation in the Congo (ONUC)
  United Nations Yemen Observation Mission (UNYOM)
  United Nations Peacekeeping Force in Cyprus (UNFICYP)
  United Nations India-Pakistan Observation Mission (UNIPOM)
  Second United Nations Emergency Force (UNEF II) – Middle East
  United Nations Disengagement Observer Force (UNDOF) – Golan Heights
  United Nations Interim Force in Lebanon (UNIFIL)
  United Nations Iran/Iraq Military Observer Group (UNIIMOG)
  United Nations Transition Assistance Group (UNTAG) – Namibia
  United Nations Angola Verification Mission (UNAVEM II and UNAVEM III) / United Nations Observer Mission in Angola (MONUA)
 United Nations Advance Mission in Cambodia (UNAMIC)
  United Nations Transitional Authority in Cambodia (UNTAC) /United Nations Military Liaison Team (UNMLT)
  United Nations Operations in Somalia (UNOSOM and UNOSOM II)
  United Nations Protection Force (UNPROFOR) – Former Yugoslavia / United Nations Confidence Restoration Operation (UNCRO) – Croatia
  United Nations Mission in Haiti (UNMIH)
  United Nations Operation in Mozambique (ONUMOZ)
  United Nations Preventive Deployment Force (UNPREDEP) – Former Yugoslav Republic of Macedonia
 United Nations Transitional Administration for Eastern Slavonia, Baranja and Western Sirmium (UNTAES)
 United Nations Mission of Observers in Prevlaka (UNMOP)
 United Nations Observer Mission in Sierra Leone (UNOMSIL) / United Nations Mission in Sierra Leone (UNAMSIL)
  United Nations Medal for East Timor (UNAMET) (UNTAET) (UNMISET)
 United Nations Interim Administration Mission in Kosovo (UNMIK)
 United Nations Mission in Sudan (UNMIS)
 United Nations Integrated Mission in Timor-Leste (UNMIT)
  United Nations Mission in South Sudan (UNMISS)
  United Nations Supervision Mission in Syria (UNSMIS)
  United Nations Special Service Medal

NATO medals
  NATO Medal for the Former Yugoslavia
  NATO Medal for Non-Article 5 Operations in the Balkans
  NATO Medal for the Non-Article 5 ISAF Operation in Afghanistan
  NATO Non-Article 5 Medal for Africa
  NATO Non-Article 5 Medal for Operation Resolute Support

CSDP medals
  Common Security and Defence Policy Service Medal

References

External links
NZ Order of Wear
NZDF Order of Wear

New Zealand-related lists
New Zealand Royal Honours System